Jérôme Cazal (born 2 November 1973) is a French handballer, currently playing as a goalkeeper for Danish Handball League side Nordsjælland Håndbold. He has previously played for league rivals FCK Håndbold.

Teams
  Virum/Sorgenfri HK
  H 43 Lund
  TuS N-Lübbecke
  Eintracht Hildesheim
  FCK Håndbold
  Nordsjælland Håndbold

External links

 player info on Nordsjælland Håndbold website
 Player info on EHF website
Rencontre avec Jérôme Cazal

1973 births
Living people
French male handball players
Expatriate handball players